Tim Suton (born 8 May 1996) is a German handball player for TBV Lemgo and the German national team.

He participated at the 2019 World Men's Handball Championship.

References

Living people
1996 births
German male handball players
Handball-Bundesliga players
Rhein-Neckar Löwen players
TuS Nettelstedt-Lübbecke players
People from Kirchheim unter Teck
Sportspeople from Stuttgart (region)